El Papalon Airport  is an airport serving the city of San Miguel in San Miguel Department, El Salvador.

See also

Transport in El Salvador
List of airports in El Salvador

References

External links
 OurAirports - El Papalon Airport
 OpenStreetMap - El Papalon
 HERE Maps - El Papalon

Airports in El Salvador